Gonzalo Barreto Mastropierro (born 22 January 1992) is a Uruguayan footballer who currently plays as a striker for Racing Montevideo.

Club career

Danubio
Born in Montevideo, Barreto began his career with local club Danubio F.C. He started with the youth team and in 2009, at the age of 17 made his debut with the first team. His debut came in an away match against Tacuarembó, in which he came off the bench and won a decisive penalty as Danubio claimed a 2–1 victory.

Lazio
Barreto's talent attracted interest from big clubs and he quickly made the move to Europe. On 2 September 2009, Barreto went to Rome to sign a five-year deal with Lazio, who bought him for about €1.781 million. However, Barreto was not be able to play for Lazio until he turned 18 in 2010, due to FIFA's restrictions regarding the transfers of minors across different continents.

Return to Danubio
In 2015 Barreto returned to Danubio F.C.

International career
Barreto established himself as a star of Uruguay's youth teams. He appeared for their under-15 side in 2007

In 2009, Barreto established himself as a key player for the under-17 national team. He competed with the side in the 2009 South American Under-17 Football Championship, held in Chile, scoring twice in their opening match win over hosts Chile. Uruguay progressed to the final group stage where Barreto scored twice more, against Bolivia and Ecuador. With four goals, he finished as the second highest goalscorer in the competition.

Uruguay's good finish meant that they qualified for the 2009 FIFA U-17 World Cup, held in Nigeria. Uruguay were eliminated in the quarter-finals by Spain on penalties. Barreto successfully converted his spot-kick in the shootout. Injuries restricted him to just two appearances at the tournament.

He has been capped by the Uruguay national under-20 football team for the 2011 Copa Aerosur.

International goals

|- bgcolor=#DFE7FF
| 1. || 20 November 2010 || Estadio Juan Carlos Durán, Santa Cruz, Bolivia ||  || 1–0 || 1–2 || Copa Aerosur
|}

References

External links
 
 

1992 births
Living people
Uruguayan footballers
Uruguayan expatriate footballers
Uruguay youth international footballers
Danubio F.C. players
S.S. Lazio players
Universidad de Concepción footballers
Sportivo Luqueño players
Montevideo Wanderers F.C. players
Rampla Juniors players
Racing Club de Montevideo players
Chilean Primera División players
Uruguayan Primera División players
Paraguayan Primera División players
Expatriate footballers in Paraguay
Uruguayan expatriate sportspeople in Paraguay
Expatriate footballers in Chile
Uruguayan expatriate sportspeople in Chile
Expatriate footballers in Italy
Uruguayan expatriate sportspeople in Italy
Association football forwards